Malvarosa is a 1958 Filipino family drama film directed by Dr. Gregorio Fernandez and written by Clodualdo del Mundo and Consuelo P. Osorio for LVN Pictures. It is based on a comics serial of the same name written by Clodualdo del Mundo in Espesyal Komiks and tells the story of a poverty-stricken nuclear family living in the nearby railroad tracks who carry their own burdens that needed to resolved.

The film stars Charito Solis, Vic Silayan, Carlos Padilla Jr., Vic Diaz, Rey Ruiz, and Eddie Rodriguez as the children of Sinforosa (Rebecca del Rio) and Leroy Salvador as Rosa's fiancé.

Plot 
Rosa, a beautiful young woman, lives in the slums situated at the nearby railroad tracks with her mother and five older brothers. By the time her alcoholic father died in a train accident, her mother Sinforosa felt guilt and depression as she became widowed. A few years later, she is going to marry his fiancé Candido but she has to deal the problems first that their family faced in spite of poverty especially Rosa's brothers who also carry their own burdens in which made Rosa stressed to have a solution as well as their confrontations. It would also tell the lives of Melanio, the eldest and an obnoxious womanizer; followed by Alberto, a man with a mean reputation to his family; Leonides, a violent man who became notorious for his crimes throughout the neighborhood; Vedasto, a scheming man whom he persuaded his sister to work with a wealthy man; and lastly, Avelino, a patient and responsible man whom he trusts his sister to eliminate their family's burden. Rosa would also witness some of the misfortunes happened in their family.

Cast 

Charito Solis as Rosa
Vic Silayan as Melanio
Carlos Padilla Jr. as Alberto
Vic Diaz as Leonides
Rey Ruiz as Vedasto
Eddie Rodriguez as Avelino
Leroy Salvador as Candido
Rebecca del Rio as Sinforosa
Linda Roxas as Miling
Johnny Reyes as Tony
Priscilla Ramirez as Aling Ipang
Ramon Olmos as Damian
Nita Ramos as Linda
Caridad Sanchez as Melanio's Woman #1
Perla Bautista as Melanio's Woman #2

Production 
During the shooting of the film, the director and its staff cooperated with the Philippine Constabulary and the Manila Railroad Company for their participation in the important scenes of the film as well as their permission to their facilities and staff.

Analysis 
Malvarosa, released in 1958, concerns a large nuclear family aspiring to recover from the devastation wrought by World War II, when both the retreating Japanese occupiers and the advancing American re-occupiers dropped so many bombs, set so many fires, and killed so many civilians that, after Hiroshima and Nagasaki, Manila was one of the most devastated cities in the world at that point, traditionally regarded as comparable in its misery to Warsaw. The country was in such dire straits that, when the American government insisted on setting up military bases and implementing parity rights as preconditions for financial aid, the Filipinos had no choice but to acquiesce.

Release 
The film was released on May 19, 1958, at the Dalisay Theatre in Manila, Philippines.

Digital restoration 
The film was restored by ABS-CBN Film Restoration Project, using the equipment of the film archives division. The restoration began with a digital scanning of frames in 4K resolution with the use of the 35mm print from the collection of LVN Pictures' library that were stored at the basement of ABS-CBN's corporate headquarters, ELJ Communications Center, in Diliman, Quezon City. After the scanning, it was restored in 2K resolution and took 80 hours to eliminate the image impairments including scratches and unstable images as well as color adjustments in order to make it very identical to its original brightness and contrast.

The digitally scanned and restored 4K version was premiered on October 17, 2019, at the Gateway Mall - Cinema 7 as part of the QCinema International Film Festival 2019. It was attended by Caridad Sanchez and the representatives of the film's cast and crew including screenwriter Clodualdo "Doy" del Mundo Jr. (representing his father), actor Rap Fernandez (representing his grandfather), Jesus Hofileña (representing Vic Silayan), and actress-singer Zsa Zsa Padilla and her daughter Zia Quizon (representing their father and grandfather, respectively).

The 4K digital scan of the film was streamed online on December 1, 2020, through ABS-CBN Film Restoration's Facebook page.

Notes

References

External links 

1958 films
1958 drama films
Philippine drama films
Tagalog-language films
Films directed by Gregorio Fernandez